Milliyet (Turkish for "nationality") is a pro-Erdogan Turkish daily newspaper published in Istanbul, Turkey.

History and profile
Milliyet came to publishing life at the Nuri Akça press in Babıali, Istanbul as a daily private newspaper on 3 May 1950. Its owner was Ali Naci Karacan. After his death in 1955 the paper was published by his son, Encüment Karacan.

For a number of years the person who made his mark on the paper as the editor in chief was Abdi İpekçi. İpekçi managed to raise the standards of the Turkish press by introducing his journalistic criteria. On 1 February 1979, İpekçi was murdered by Mehmet Ali Ağca, who would later attempt to assassinate the Pope John Paul II.

Milliyet is published in broadsheet format.

In 2001 Milliyet had a circulation of 337,000 copies. According to comScore, Milliyet's website is the fifth most visited news website in Europe.

Ownership
In 1979 the founding Karacan family sold the paper to Aydın Doğan. Erdoğan Demirören, who owned 25% of the paper, later also sold his stake to Doğan. In October 1998 the paper was briefly sold to Korkmaz Yiğit, being bought back within weeks when Yiğit's business empire collapsed in the face of unrelated fraud allegations.

The paper was purchased by a joint venture of the Demirören Group and Karacan Group in May 2011, but after legal and financial issues Karacan sold its stake to Demirören in February 2012.

Editorial line
Since 1994, Milliyet has abandoned its stable, "upmarket" journalism established by Abdi İpekçi for a middle-market editorial line akin to that of Hürriyet. Internet edition of Milliyet often incorporates sensational material from The Sun and Daily Mail and there is tremendous amount of overlap among the daily coverage, such as identical articles and photographs.

Milliyet has been criticised for having self-censored a column that was critical of the Prime Minister's reaction to a press leak. The column was frozen out for two weeks and then blanket-refused for publication.

In early 2012 Milliyet fired Ece Temelkuran after she had written articles critical of the government's handling of the December 2011 Uludere massacre, and Nuray Mert after Turkish Prime Minister Recep Tayyip Erdoğan publicly criticized her.

In 2013, Milliyet fired two columnists Hasan Cemal and Can Dündar, who had taken critical stances against the AKP government.

Supplements
Milliyet has published several supplements. One of them was Milliyet Çocuk, a children's  magazine published as a supplement of the paper between its start in 1972 and 1974 before becoming an independent publication.

Digital archives
In September 2009, Milliyet opened its digital archive becoming the first Turkish newspaper to do so.

Notable people

See also
 List of newspapers in Turkey

References

External links
  
 Milliyet news 
 Milliyet's digital archive 
 

1926 establishments in Turkey
Publications established in 1950
Newspapers published in Istanbul
Turkish-language newspapers
Nationalist newspapers
Daily newspapers published in Turkey